Variety Parade is a 1936 British musical revue film directed by Oswald Mitchell. It was shot at Cricklewood Studios.

Cast

References

Bibliography
 Low, Rachael. Filmmaking in 1930s Britain. George Allen & Unwin, 1985.
 Wood, Linda. British Films, 1927-1939. British Film Institute, 1986.

External links

1936 films
British musical films
1936 musical films
Films shot at Cricklewood Studios
Films directed by Oswald Mitchell
British black-and-white films
1930s English-language films
1930s British films